The 2000 AFC Asian Cup is an international football tournament that was held in Lebanon from 12 to 29 October 2000. The 12 national teams involved in the tournament were required to register a squad of minimum 18 players and maximum 23 players, minimum three of whom must be goalkeepers. Only players in these squads were eligible to take part in the tournament.

The position listed for each player is per the official squad list published by AFC. The age listed for each player is on 5 January 2019, the first day of the tournament. The numbers of caps and goals listed for each player do not include any matches played after the start of tournament. The nationality for each club reflects the national association (not the league) to which the club is affiliated. A flag is included for coaches that are of a different nationality than their own national team.

Group A

Iran
Head coach: Jalal Talebi

Iraq
Head coach:  Milan Živadinović

Lebanon
Head coach:  Josip Skoblar

Thailand
Head coach:  Peter Withe

Group B

China
Head coach:  Bora Milutinović

Indonesia
Head coach: Nandar Iskandar

Kuwait
Head coach:  Dušan Uhrin

South Korea
Head coach: Huh Jung-moo

Group C

Japan
Head coach:  Philippe Troussier

Qatar
Head coach:  Džemal Hadžiabdić

Saudi Arabia
Head coach:  Milan Máčala and Nasser Al-Johar

Uzbekistan
Head coach:  Yuriy Sarkisyan

References
At world football website

AFC Asian Cup squads